Zuni-Bandera volcanic field (also known as Bandera lava field, Grants Malpais and Malpais volcanic field) is a volcanic field located in the state of New Mexico, United States.

The volcanic field has been considered for geothermal exploitation.

It is on the Trails of the Ancients Byway, one of the designated New Mexico Scenic Byways.

Origins
The Zuni-Bandera volcanic field lies along the Jemez Lineament, a zone of weakness in the lower crust and upper mantle that allows magma formed in the mantle to reach the surface. The magmas erupted in the field includes both tholeiitic basalt (an iron-rich basalt with a low alkali content) and alkaline basalt. The tholeiitic basalt shows chemical and isotopic signatures of magma formed from the spinel-rich mantle rock of the lithosphere, the outer rigid shell of the Earth that includes the crust and uppermost mantle. The alkaline basalt, by contrast, formed from the garnet-rich mantle rock of the asthenosphere, the ductile region of the mantle just below the lithosphere. Little crustal material was assimilated into the magmas, although the tholeiitic magma experienced some fractional crystallization at shallow depths in the crust.

Exploration
A significant portion of the volcanic field is part of the El Malpais National Monument. Several of the lava tubes are available for exploration by permit. In addition, hiking trails enable visitors to see the lava field's unique characteristics.

Bandera Crater

The nearly 17.5 mile long lava tube emanating from this crater is the longest in North America. Most of the lava tube has collapsed but portions still remain as caves. One of these caves contains an over 900 year old ice cave and can be accessed by the public. The land that contains the ice cave was purchased by Sylvestre Mirabal in the early 1900s. Mirabal mined the ice in the ice cave to cool the beer in a saloon that he operated. His daughter married into the Candelaria family, which continues to own and operate the ice cave to this day. Ice mining was halted in 1946.

The ice cave, itself, never gets above 31 °F. It is currently 20 ft thick and has a green hue due to Arctic algae.

Other Notable Vents

See also
 List of volcanoes in the United States
 El Malpais National Monument

References

Malpaíses (landform)
Volcanic fields of New Mexico
Landforms of Cibola County, New Mexico
Lava fields
Pliocene volcanism
Pleistocene volcanism
Potentially active volcanoes
Neogene geology of New Mexico
Quaternary geology of New Mexico
Pliocene United States
Pleistocene United States
Basin and Range Province